Aedoeus is a genus of beetles in the family Cerambycidae, containing the following species:

 Aedoeus anjouanensis Quentin & Villiers, 1979
 Aedoeus brevicollis Fairmaire, 1901
 Aedoeus concolor Fairmaire, 1897
 Aedoeus geniculatus Waterhouse, 1880
 Aedoeus marginatus Fairmaire, 1903
 Aedoeus thoracicus Fairmaire, 1902

References

Dorcasominae